Give Me All You Got is the sixth album by Carrie Rodriguez, and was released in 2013. It was recorded at Fantasy Studios in Berkeley, California and was produced by Lee Townsend.

Background
The album was released two years after Rodriguez returned to her home town in Austin, after she had lived in Brooklyn, New York, and "had a second to reflect on [her] life".  Two songs on the album, "Sad Joy" and "Devil in Mind" were collaborations with songwriter Chip Taylor.  When asked if the album had a common lyrical theme, she answered that "A lot of these songs are about feeling intense emotion and letting it be out in the open. Not shying away."  

Rodriguez explained in an interview that the inspiration for "Sad Joy" was a conversation with Taylor about "pretty heavy things like family members with terminal illness and deaths of friends (and) how those terrible sad things can also come with a lot of beauty.  There's something about getting together with people even if it is during a tragic event that brings about a really joyful energy.  It's a communal feeling, a deep connection".  They wrote it "in about 10 minutes," she said to Michael Bialas of the Huffington Post.

Critical reception
Hal Horowitz of American Songwriter rated the album 80/100 on Metacritic (4 out of 5 on American Songwriter), saying "Her violin skills are world class but play second fiddle—pun intended— to potent songwriting and vocals. Emotional lyrics rooted in letting go of attachments and propping others up are wonderfully communicated with low boil intensity. Old cohort Chip Taylor writes or co-composes a handful of songs including the opening 'Devil in Mind' that combines Rodriguez's Austin rustic roots with the urban influences she has acquired through a decade of living in Brooklyn... The result is her finest, most poignant and accomplished album in an already impressive seven year solo career."

Lee Zimmerman of Blurt gave her a 7 out of 10, saying "Even on a song like 'Devil In Mind', which seemingly pays such heed to moss-covered Gothic-like environs, she still manages to exude some saucy spunk and spark... Give Me All You Got is as seductive and enticing as its name implies because clearly, Rodriguez is giving all she has as well."

Cara Tillman of the Austin Chronicle noted that the album Give Me All You Got "plays out as a hymn to the free-spirited sinner who embraces the compulsion for adventure, as well as the need to put down roots."

Track listing

Personnel
 Erik Deutsch - keyboards
 Don Heffington - drums, percussion
 Hans Holzen - vocals, acoustic guitar, electric guitar, lap steel guitar, mandolin
 Luke Jacobs - vocals, acoustic guitar, electric guitar, lap steel guitar
 Kyle Kegerreis - acoustic bass, electric bass
 Carrie Rodriguez - vocals, tenor guitar, fiddle

Chart performance

References

2013 albums
Carrie Rodriguez albums